The Eurovision Song Contest 1962 was the 7th edition of the annual Eurovision Song Contest. The contest was organised by the European Broadcasting Union (EBU) and host broadcaster Compagnie Luxembourgeoise de Télédiffusion (CLT), and was held at the Villa Louvigny on Sunday 18 March 1962 hosted by the Luxembourgish speaker Mireille Delannoy. This remains the last time that the final of the contest was not held on a Saturday, as since 1963 the final of the contest has consistently been held on a Saturday evening.

Sixteen countries participated in the contest – the same that took part the year before.

It was also the third consecutive winning song performed in French. For the first time in the contest's history,  and  all scored nul points.

Location 

The 1962 Eurovision Song Contest was hosted in Luxembourg City. The venue chosen to host the 1962 contest was the Villa Louvigny.  The building served as the headquarters of Compagnie Luxembourgeoise de Télédiffusion, the forerunner of RTL Group.  It is located in Municipal Park, in the Ville Haute quarter of the centre of the city.

Format 
After France's entry had been performed, there was a short power failure rendering the screens dark. There also seemed to be an even shorter power failure during the Netherlands' entry, when viewers around Europe only saw darkness on their television screens when the Netherlands performed. The power failure seemed to affect the Netherlands' score during the voting. Nevertheless, the song turned out to be popular in Europe after the contest.

Participating countries 

All countries who participated in the Eurovision Song Contest 1961 also participated in this edition.

Conductors 
Each performance had a conductor who conducted the orchestra.

 George de Godzinsky
 Henri Segers
 Jean Roderès
 
 Kai Mortensen
 Egon Kjerrman
 
 Dolf van der Linden
 Franck Pourcel
 Øivind Bergh
 
 Jože Privšek
 Angela Morley
 Jean Roderès
 Cinico Angelini
 Raymond Lefèvre

Returning artists

Participants and results

Detailed voting results 

This year marked the second jury voting system change in the contest's history, moving away from a point per favourite song from 10-member juries to the allocation of 3, 2 and 1 points given to the top three favourite songs from each country's 10-member jurors' ratings.

3 points
Below is a summary of all 3 points received:

Spokespersons 

Listed below is the order in which votes were cast during the 1962 contest along with the spokesperson who was responsible for announcing the votes for their respective country.

 TBC
 Enzo Tortora
 Robert Diligent
 Alex Macintosh
 Mladen Delić
 
 
 André Valmy
 
 Klaus Havenstein
 Tage Danielsson
 
 Emil Kollpacher

Broadcasts 

Each participating broadcaster was required to relay the contest via its networks. Non-participating EBU member broadcasters were also able to relay the contest as "passive participants". Broadcasters were able to send commentators to provide coverage of the contest in their own native language and to relay information about the artists and songs to their television viewers.

Known details on the broadcasts in each country, including the specific broadcasting stations and commentators are shown in the tables below.

Notes

References

External links

 
1962
Music festivals in Luxembourg
1962 in music
Music in Luxembourg City
1962 in Luxembourg
1960s in Luxembourg City
Events in Luxembourg City